A cur is a type of dog.

CUR may refer to:
 The IAAF code for Curaçao
 The IATA code for Hato International Airport, Curaçao
 Cambridge University Radio
 CUR, file format for cursor images from Microsoft, practically identical to ICO (icon image file format)
 The Greater scaup was historically known in southern England as the Cur
 The French gastronomic critic Curnonsky